Jefry Leonal Marté Paulino (born June 21, 1991) is a Dominican professional baseball first baseman, third baseman and left fielder who is currently a free agent. He has played in Major League Baseball (MLB) for the Detroit Tigers and Los Angeles Angels.

Career

Minor leagues 
Marté signed as an international free agent with the New York Mets.  He played for the St. Lucie Mets of the Class A-Advanced Florida State League in 2011 and the Binghamton Mets of the Class AA Eastern League in 2012. He participated in the All-Star Futures Game during the 2011 season and the Arizona Fall League after the 2011 season.

The Mets traded Marté to the Oakland Athletics on December 18, 2012, in exchange for outfielder Collin Cowgill. On November 22, 2014, Marté signed a minor league contract with the Detroit Tigers.

Detroit Tigers 

Marté was promoted to the major leagues by the Tigers on July 4, 2015, and made his major league debut the next day. In his first career major league start on July 8, he got his first major league hit, an RBI double in the second inning, and his first major league home run in the fourth inning. Marte filled in well for an injured Miguel Cabrera in July and August, batting .250 (13-for-52) with four doubles, three home runs and seven RBIs. He batted .275 with 25 doubles, 15 home runs and 65 RBIs for the Toledo Mud Hens of the Class AAA International League. He was a September call-up, returning to the Tigers on September 8, 2015.

Los Angeles Angels 
The Tigers traded Marté to the Los Angeles Angels in exchange for Kody Eaves on January 27, 2016. He began the 2016 season with the Salt Lake Bees of the Class AAA Pacific Coast League, and was promoted to the Angels in May. He became a free agent after the 2018 season.

Hanshin Tigers 
On December 28, 2018, Marté signed with the Hanshin Tigers of Nippon Professional Baseball (NPB).

On December 10, 2019, Marté signed a 1-year extension to remain with the Tigers. He became a free agent after the 2022 season.

References

External links

1991 births
Living people
Binghamton Mets players
Detroit Tigers players
Dominican Republic expatriate baseball players in Japan
Dominican Republic expatriate baseball players in the United States
Gulf Coast Athletics players
Gulf Coast Mets players
Hanshin Tigers players

Los Angeles Angels players
Major League Baseball first basemen
Major League Baseball players from the Dominican Republic
Major League Baseball third basemen
Midland RockHounds players
Nippon Professional Baseball first basemen
People from La Romana, Dominican Republic
Peoria Javelinas players
Salt Lake Bees players
Savannah Sand Gnats players
St. Lucie Mets players
Toledo Mud Hens players
Toros del Este players